Keşli is a village in Tarsus district of Mersin Province, Turkey. It is a mountain village. The population of Keşli was 237  as of 2012.

References

Villages in Tarsus District